Arjun Mathur (born 18 October 1981) is a British-Indian actor working predominantly in Bollywood films, web series and television serials. He was seen internationally in the British drama series, Indian Summers and plays the lead character in the Amazon Original series, Made in Heaven (TV series), which earned him an International Emmy award nomination for 'Best Performance by an Actor'.

Early life and education
Mathur was born in London, England. but grew up between New Delhi and Mumbai, India. His father, Rakesh Mathur, is a hotelier. He has an older brother, Gautam and a younger sister, Sonia. His mother Reynoo Mathur, died in a car accident when he was just thirteen years old.

Mathur studied at St. Columbas School, New Delhi, St. Mary's School, Mumbai, The British School, New Delhi and Oaklands College, St Albans, Hertfordshire, where he completed his A-Level schooling.

He chose to not pursue a college degree and instead, trained as an actor at Barry John's Institute as well as the Lee Strasberg Theatre and Film Institute in New York. Before he started acting, he worked as an Assistant Director on several big-budget Indian films such as [[Bunty Aur Babli|'Bunty Aur Babli''']] and 'Rang De Basanti  (The Color of Spring)'.

Career
Arjun was discovered by Mira Nair and Farhan Akhtar simultaneously, through their respective short films, 'Migration' and 'Positive' for the 'Aids Jaago' project, which premiered at the Toronto International Film Festival, 2007. This was followed by several remarkable performances in mainstream Indian films like 'Luck By Chance', 'My Name Is Khan' and 'Ankur Arora Murder Case', as well as critically acclaimed independent films like 'Barah Aana', 'Coffee Bloom', the National-Award winning 'I Am' and the English language film, [[Fireflies (film)|'Fireflies']], for which he received a Best Actor nomination at the New York Indian Film Festival, 2013.

In 2012, he garnered praise for the youth-centric mini-series, 'Bring On The Night', which was the first of its kind produced in India, before the streaming revolution took hold. Arjun has appeared in numerous television commercials and was a brand-ambassador for the leading Indian lifestyle brand, 'Godrej' from 2013 till 2016. He was also seen in Channel 4's British drama series, 'Indian Summers' as the volatile nationalist, 'Naresh Banerjee'. The 2018 Netflix original film, 'Brij Mohan Amar Rahe (Long Live Brij Mohan)' saw Arjun step away from his image and impress audiences and critics as an underwear salesman from Delhi, who tries to fake his own death and fails miserably.

In 2019, Arjun played the lead in Zoya Akhtar's Amazon original series, 'Made In Heaven''' and received a nomination in the 'Best Performance by an Actor' category at the International Emmy Awards 2020, for his nuanced portrayal of a gay man living in urban India at a time when homosexuality was illegal. The show itself received worldwide audience and critical acclaim and will return for a second season.

He was last seen in '''The Gone Game''', a suspense thriller series that was set, conceived, shot and released during the COVID-19 lockdown in 2020.

Filmography

References

External links

Living people
1980 births
Male actors in Hindi cinema
St. Columba's School, Delhi alumni
Indian male film actors